The Minnesota Machine was a women's tackle football team of the Women's Football Alliance (WFA) from 2009 to 2017. The team was started by Lisa Olson on December 8, 2008, after stints with the Indiana Speed and Minnesota Vixen, and began play in the WFA's inaugural 2009 season. Based in the Minneapolis-Saint Paul metropolitan area, the Machine played its home games at different locations in the area each year.

Season-By-Season

|-
|2009 || 5 || 3 || 0 || 2nd American Midwest || --
|-
|2010 || 6 || 2 || 0 || 1st American Midwest || Lost AC Quarterfinal (Iowa)
|-
|2011 || 5 || 3 || 0 || 1st American Upper Midwest || Lost AC Quarterfinal (Kansas City)
|-
|2012 || 6 || 3 || 0 || 1st WFA American 10 || Lost AC Quarterfinal (St. Louis)
|-
!Totals || 22 || 11 || 0
|colspan="2"| (including playoffs)

* = Current standing

2009

Season schedule

** = Won by forfeit

2010

Season schedule
Home games were played at James Griffin Stadium in St. Paul, MN

2011

Standings

Season schedule
Home games were played at Einer Anderson Stadium in Minnetonka, MN

2012

Season schedule
Home games were played at Woodbury High School Stadium in Woodbury, MN

References

External links
Minnesota Machine

American football teams in Minneapolis–Saint Paul
Women's Football Alliance teams
American football teams established in 2008
Minnetonka, Minnesota
2008 establishments in Minnesota
Women's sports in Minnesota